René Kuhl was a Swiss bobsledder who competed in the early 1960s. He won a bronze medal in the four-man event at the 1960 FIBT World Championships in Cortina d'Ampezzo.

References
Bobsleigh four-man world championship medalists since 1930

Possibly living people
Swiss male bobsledders
Year of birth missing
20th-century Swiss people